Hengaran may refer to:
 Hengaran, Kerman
 Hengaran, South Khorasan